Kirk Sandall railway station serves the suburb of Kirk Sandall in Doncaster, South Yorkshire, England. The current station opened by British Rail in 1991 and is not on the site of the original station, which was about  up the line eastwards.

Facilities
The station consists of a single concrete island platform located between the inner 'fast' lines on the quad track section of route between Marshgate Junction, Doncaster and Thorne Junction.  It is unstaffed but there is a ticket machine near to the car park entrance.  A single waiting shelter is the only structure on the platform apart from bench seating, timetable posters and customer information screens.  Both platforms are fully accessible by means of a long inclined ramp from the main entrance on the road above.

Service
The station provides an hourly service eastbound to Scunthorpe and Hull during the daytime Monday through Saturday. Westbound service comprises two trains per hour to Doncaster. There are no longer any regular services to Meadowhall and  since the spring 2019 timetable change apart from a single late evening working.  Passengers must change at Doncaster for onward connections.

There is no return service westbound.

In February 2013 the line northeast of Hatfield and Stainforth station towards Thorne was blocked by the Hatfield Colliery landslip, with all services over the section halted. The line reopened in July 2013.

Notes

External links

Railway stations in Doncaster
DfT Category F1 stations
Railway stations opened by British Rail
Railway stations in Great Britain opened in 1991
Northern franchise railway stations
1991 establishments in England
Railway stations served by TransPennine Express